The Costa Rica men's national tennis team represents Costa Rica in Davis Cup tennis competition and are governed by the Federación Costarricense de Tenis.

Costa Rica currently compete in the Americas Zone of Group III.  They have reached Group II on six occasions, but have yet to win a match at that level.

History
Costa Rica competed in its first Davis Cup in 1990.

Current team (2022) 

 Jesse Flores
 Sebastián Quiros
 Pablo Núñez
 Julián Lozardo
 Luca Lo Nardo

See also
Davis Cup
Costa Rica Fed Cup team

External links

Davis Cup teams
Davis Cup
Davis Cup